Jan Cimbura is a 1941 Czech drama film directed by František Čáp and starring Gustav Nezval, Jiřina Štěpničková and Jaroslav Průcha.

Main cast
 Gustav Nezval as Jan Cimbura 
 Jiřina Štěpničková as Marjánka 
 Jaroslav Průcha as Farmer Kovanda 
 Marie Brožová as Rozárka Kovandová
 Vilém Pfeiffer as Josef Piska 
 Vladimír Šmeral as Bartík, the troublemaker 
 František Roland
 Otýlie Benísková
 Eva Svobodová as Anýzka, the mad woman 
 Stanislava Strobachová as Barča, bar girl 
 Rudolf Deyl as Jíra 
 Theodor Pištěk as Lawyer Miltner 
 Bolek Prchal as Bartík's Father 
 Ema Kreutzerová as Miltnerová

References

Bibliography 
 Hana Kubátová & Jan Láníček. The Jew in Czech and Slovak Imagination, 1938-89: Antisemitism, the Holocaust, and Zionism. BRILL, 2018.

External links 
 

1941 films
Czech drama films
1941 drama films
1940s Czech-language films
Films directed by František Čáp
Czech black-and-white films
1940s Czech films